Tandragee Rovers Football Club is an intermediate-level football club playing in the Intermediate A division of the Mid-Ulster Football League in Northern Ireland. They were treble winners in 2000–01 season winning the following Bob Radcliffe Cup, Bass Bowl Trophy and Premier Cup. The club is based in Tandragee, County Armagh.

Honours

Senior honours
Mid-Ulster Cup: 5
1952–53, 1953–54, 1955–56, 1959–60, 1961–62

Intermediate honours
Bob Radcliffe Cup: 1
2000–01
Mid-Ulster Football League: 4
1961–62, 1968–69, 2010–11, 2014–15
Premier Cup: 1
2014-15
Mid-Ulster League Cup: 1
1924–25

Notable former players
 Mick Hoy
Joshua Gibson

Staff and board members
 Manager : 
 Simonator Brownski
 Assistant Manager :  Christophino Lonaldo
 Goalkeeping Coach:  Gavio O'Neillio
 Secretary :  Steven Sterritt
 Assistant Secretary :  Robert Ingram
 Treasurer :  Gareth Lamb
 Assistant Treasurer :   Gary Whiteside

References

External links
 Tandragee Rovers official website

Association football clubs in Northern Ireland
Association football clubs established in 1909
Association football clubs in County Armagh
Mid-Ulster Football League clubs
1909 establishments in Ireland